Hélène Grémillon (born 8 February 1977 in Poitiers) is a French writer.

Biography 
Hélène Grémillon was destined very young to literature. She studied letters and obtained a master's degree, then turned to history, thus obtaining a DEA.

She began writing her first novel, Le Confident. This book, published in 2010, quickly became a best seller. Translated into twenty languages, it sold more than 250,000 copies and more than 250,000 copies in pocket edition, and appeared in some twenty countries. Le Confident is a love story, recounting the life of Camille, who receives a letter from an unknown sender after her mother's death, between the year 1938 and the year 1942.

She radically changes scenery in her second novel, La Garçonnière, a suspense novel inspired by a real drama happening in Argentina in Buenos Aires in 1987.

She married French singer Julien Clerc 17 December 2012 in the  16th arrondissement of Paris.

Works 
2010: Le Confident, Paris, Éditions Plon, 301 p. .
- Lauriers Verts de La Forêt des Livres - Prix du Premier Roman 2010
- Prix Jeune Talent Littéraire des Clubs de Lecture de Saint-Germain-en-Laye 2011 
- Prix Emmanuel Roblès - Prix des lecteurs de la Ville de Blois 2011 
-  - Coup de Cœur du Jury 2011 
- Prix Palissy 2011.
Ce roman a été traduit en 27 langues

2013: La Garçonnière, Paris, Éditions Flammarion, coll. « Littérature française », 356 p. .

References

External links 
 Site de l’auteur
 Hélène Grémillon on Babelio
 Hélène Grémillon présente Le confident on YouTube 

21st-century French novelists
French women novelists
Prix Emmanuel Roblès recipients
People from Poitiers
1977 births
Living people
21st-century French women writers